Paulo Bersamina (born 1998) is a Filipino chess player. He was awarded the title of International Master (IM) by FIDE in 2014.

He has represented Philippines in the Chess Olympiad, including 2014 (where he finished with 5/9 on board 4) and 2016 (2.5/5 on board 5).

He qualified to play for the Chess World Cup 2021 where he was defeated 1.5-0.5 by R. Praggnanandhaa in the first round.

References

External links 
 
 Paulo Bersamina chess games at 365Chess.com
 

1998 births
Living people
Filipino chess players
Competitors at the 2021 Southeast Asian Games
Southeast Asian Games competitors for the Philippines